Smyrna High School is a high school in the Rutherford County school district located in Smyrna, Tennessee, United States.

History
Smyrna High was founded in 1919. In 1988, it was split into the current La Vergne High School and Smyrna High School in order to provide adequate room for student enrollment. In 2000, Smyrna went through yet another split with the building of Blackman High School. The current Smyrna Middle School building was the previous home of Smyrna High. In June 2011, Robert Raikes retired as principal of Smyrna High School after 37 years at the position, and over 50 years of being with the school. His replacement was named a month later when Rick Powell, a longtime assistant principal at Smyrna, was promoted to head principal. In May 2018, Dr. Sherri Southerland was announced as Powell's replacement after his retirement.

Academics
Smyrna High offers AP and Cambridge classes. The school offers specialized elective focuses in many areas:

 Architecture & Construction
 Audio and Visual Production
 Banking & Finance
 Business Management
 Criminal Justice
 Culinary Arts
 Design Communications
 Horticulture Science
 Interior Design
 JROTC I-IV
 MEP Systems
 Marketing Management
 Sport & Human Performance
 Teaching as a Profession
 Technology
 Therapeutic Services
 Veterinary & Animal Science

Activities

Smyrna High has a variety of extracurricular activities, like archery, art, band, Beta Club, Beta Epsilon, Philanthropic Society, book club, Bulldog Bank, Bulldog News Network, chess, creative writing, debate, DECA, educators rising, Fellowship of Christian Athletes, FFA, First Priority, French Club, Gold Dust, Historical Society, HOSA, Interact, JROTC, Leo Club, Mu Alpha Theta, National Honor Society, Purple Dynasty, SADD, Science Olympiad, Spanish Club, Student Council, Theatre, and Youth in Government.

Athletics
Smyrna High is a former TSSAA state champion in football (2006 and 2007), girls' basketball (1961 and 1982), softball (2013), girls' bowling (2013), and boys' bowling (2005, 2006, 2009, 2011 and 2018).

Notable alumnus
Sonny Gray, Major League Baseball pitcher

References

External links
 

Public high schools in Tennessee
Schools in Rutherford County, Tennessee
Smyrna, Tennessee